The Order of the Starry Cross (or Order of the Star Cross/Star Cross Order; German: Sternkreuz-Orden) is an imperial Austrian dynastic order for Catholic noble ladies, founded in 1668. The order still exists under the House of Habsburg-Lorraine.

History 
The Order was founded in 1668 by Eleonora Gonzaga of Mantua, dowager empress of the Holy Roman Empire. This all-female order was confirmed by Pope Clement IX on 28 June 1668 and was placed under the spiritual management of the Prince-Bishop of Vienna. Only high-born ladies could be invested with the Order, including “princesses, countesses, and other high nobility.” Once invested, members were to “devote themselves to the service and worship of the Holy Cross, and to lead a virtuous life in the exercise of religion and works of charity.”

According to legend, the Habsburg dynasty owned a piece of the True Cross on which Jesus was crucified. Though it is impossible to prove its authenticity, the holy relic was set in gold and worn by at least two Holy Roman Emperors, Maximilian II and Ferdinand III.  Ferdinand III’s last consort, Empress Eleanora, was given the relic by her stepson, Emperor Leopold I, after Ferdinand’s 1657 death. In the aftermath of a fire at the Hofburg on 2 February 1668 the relic was discovered in near-perfect condition. The dowager empress founded the Order in celebration that the relic had survived the fire, believing it to be a true miracle.

In 1881, Empress Elisabeth accorded multiple noble ladies of the royal Belgian court the Starry Cross, after the engagement of Archduke Rudolf.

Members of the Order wore the following insignia:

"An oval medallion, with a broad blue enameled border, inclosing a black enameled Eagle with two heads, and claws, both of gold, on which lies a Gold Cross, enameled green, and bordered with brown wood.  Over this, on an intwined (sic) wreath in black letters, on a white ground, is the motto of the Order, "Salus et Gloria” – (Gail and Glory.)  It is worn, pendent to a strip of black riband (sic), on the left breast."

Classes
 The order was conceived with only one class

High Protectresses (Höchste Schutzfrauen)

Current administration 
According to the website of the Archdiocese of Vienna, the officers of the Order are:

 High Protectress : Archduchess Gabriela of Austria
 Chancellor : Count Norbert von Salburg-Falkenstein
 Secretary : Altgraf Niklas zu Salm-Reifferscheid-Raitz

Sources
  Tagore, Rajah Sir Sourindro Mohun. The Orders of Knighthood, British and Foreign. Calcutta: The Catholic Orphan Press, 1884.  

Starry Cross,Order of the
Starry Cross, Order of
Orders of chivalry of Austria
1668 establishments in the Holy Roman Empire
 7